A Drummer Boy Christmas is the fourth studio album by For King & Country, an Australian Christian pop duo comprising brothers Luke Smallbone and Joel Smallbone, released via Word Entertainment on 30 October 2020. It features appearances by Needtobreathe and Gabby Barrett. The album was produced by Tedd Tjornhom and For King & Country, co-produced by Benjamin Backus, and Matt Hales handling executive production.

A Drummer Boy Christmas became a commercially successful album upon its release, debuting at No. 2 on Billboard's Top Christian Albums Chart in the United States. A Drummer Boy Christmas received nominations for the GMA Dove Award Christmas / Special Event Album of the Year and Recorded Music Packaging of the Year at the 2021 GMA Dove Awards.

Background
In September 2020, For King & Country announced A Drummer Boy Christmas as their first full-length Christmas album, due to be out on 30 October 2020 and availing the album for pre-order. The album was inspired by a concept that originated near the band's beginning, when they Joel and Luke Smallbone were rehearsing for a Christmas tour. The album comprises two original Christmas songs: "Heavenly Hosts" and "The Carol of Joseph (I Believe In You)"; and contains guest appearances from Needtobreathe featuring on the track "O Come, O Come Emmanuel" while the song "Go Tell It On The Mountain" featuring guest vocals from Gabby Barrett.

Release and promotion

Singles
On October 2, 2020, For King & Country announced that "O Come, O Come Emmanuel" featuring Needtobreathe and "Little Drummer Boy" would be serviced to Christian radio in the United States as the official singles from the album, revealing the album's track-listing.

"Heavenly Hosts" was serviced to Christian radio stations in the United States on 3 November 2021, becoming the album's third single.

Promotional singles
On October 2, 2020, For King & Country released "Joy to the World" as the first promotional single from the album, accompanied with a lyric video. On October 16, 2020, For King & Country released "Heavenly Hosts" as the second and final promotional single from the album, accompanied with a lyric video.

Touring
On 7 October 2020, For King & Country announced that they will be embarking on A Drummer Boy Drive-In: The Christmas Tour, in support of the album. The tour is partnership with the Salvation Army, for a national toy drive encouraging concertgoers to bring new, packaged toys for collection by local Salvation Army representatives and distribute them to families struggling during the holiday season. The tour spanned 20 dates, launched on 12 November 2020 at the Silver Lake Sports Complex in Norco, California, and concluded on 20 December 2020 at the Five Flags Speedway in Pensacola, Florida.

On 26 July 2021, For King & Country announced that they will be going on A Drummer Boy Christmas Tour, also in support of the album. The tour spanned 14 dates, and launched on 27 November 2021 at the Van Andel Arena in Grand Rapids, Michigan, and concluded on 19 December 2021 at the Ryman Auditorium in Nashville, Tennessee.

On 26 July 2022, For King & Country announced that they will be going back to A Drummer Boy Christmas Tour that winter. The tour spanned 15 dates, in which it launched on 26 November 2022 at the T-Mobile Center in Kansas City, Missouri, and concluded on 19 December 2022 at the Ryman Auditorium for the second consecutive year. The tour saw the Ryman for the third straight year, as well as it returned to Florida after the absence in 2021. The tour included the Estero and Grand Rapids stops for the second time and the Orlando stop for a second time but at a different venue.

Reception

Critical response

Jesus Freak Hideout's John Underdown noted the oddity in following up a successful album (Burn the Ships) with a holiday themed album, but acknowledged the band's success, saying: "Ultimately, what sets this album above its peers is the direction and purpose behind the songs picked and the way they're ordered. This thoughtfulness is felt and allows for deeper layers of reflection where other Christmas records only provide background fluff." In a positive review for NewReleaseToday, JJ Francesco opined that A Drummer Boy Christmas is "a reverent and intimate Christmas pageant of an album."

Accolades

Commercial performance
In the United States, A Drummer Boy Christmas earned 13,000 equivalent album units in its first week of sales, and as a result debuted at No. 2 on the Top Christian Albums Chart dated November 14, 2020, the band's sixth top ten release on the tally. The album concurrently registered on the mainstream Billboard 200 chart at No. 50.

Track listing

Charts

Weekly charts

Year-end charts

Release history

References

2020 albums
2020 Christmas albums
For King & Country (band) albums